The Caves of Hotton are speleothem caves located in Wallonia near Hotton in Belgium, which were discovered in 1958 and are around 5 or 6 km long and 70 metres deep. A stream called Syphon runs at the bottom of the caves.

Gallery

References

External links

 Hotton's Caves (incl. cave map and images)

Limestone caves
Show caves in Belgium
Hotton
Landforms of Luxembourg (Belgium)
Tourist attractions in Luxembourg (Belgium)
Hotton